Dascia is a genus of moths of the family Yponomeutidae.

Species
Dascia sagittifera - Meyrick, 1893 

Yponomeutidae